Got to Dance - Po Prostu Taniec is a Polish reality talent show dance competition that has been broadcasting on Polsat in Poland, since 3 March 2012. Auditions for the show take place in various cities around Poland and are open to all dance acts of any age, style or size.

The show airs on Polsat, also in HD, and is hosted by Maciej Dowbor and Katarzyna Kępka. The prize money is currently 100,000 PLN for the winning act.

Format
There are four stages to the competition:

Stage 1: Producers' auditions (these auditions decide who will perform in front of the judges, but they are not broadcast or acknowledged on the show)
Stage 2: Judges' auditions
Stage 3: Live Semi-finals (each act performs in one semi-final, with only 2 advancing to the final)
Stage 4: Live Final

Voting

Viewers can vote via phone on liveshows, during auditions viewers can award money to their favorite dancers via the official Facebook application - dancers receive 100 PLN for every single per cent.

Series overview

Season 1 (2012)

Finalist

Season 2 (2012)

Finalist

Season 3 (2013)

Finalist

Season 4 (2013)

Finalist

Transmissions

Original series

References

External links

 (official)

2012 Polish television series debuts
Polish reality television series
2013 Polish television series endings
Polsat original programming